Schalchen is a municipality in the district of Braunau am Inn in the Austrian state of Upper Austria.

Geography
Schalchen lies in the Innviertel. About 56 percent of the municipality is forest and 39 percent farmland.

References

Cities and towns in Braunau am Inn District